Ahmed Ali Al-Haifi (born 1 January 1994), is a Yemeni footballer who currently plays for Al-Nahda in Oman Professional League.

International career
Al-Haifi was selected to the Yemeni squad that played at the 2019 AFC Asian Cup in the United Arab Emirates.

References

1994 births
Living people
Yemeni footballers
Yemeni expatriate footballers
Yemen international footballers
Yemeni expatriate sportspeople in Oman
Yemeni expatriate sportspeople in Qatar
Expatriate footballers in Oman
Expatriate footballers in Qatar
Al-Ahli Club Sana'a players
Al Yarmuk Al Rawda players
Al Kharaitiyat SC players
Dhofar Club players
Al-Nahda Club (Oman) players
Yemeni League players
Oman Professional League players
Qatar Stars League players
2019 AFC Asian Cup players
Association football midfielders